Madurai railway division is a railway division belonging to the Southern Railways (SR), India. Officially created in 1956, it spans over  making it the largest railway division of the Southern Railways. Prior to the formation of the Thiruvananthapuram railway division which was carved out of the division, it was one of the largest railway divisions in the whole of the country. Currently it covers up to 12 districts of Tamil Nadu and 1 in Kerala. Its headquarters is in Madurai.

History

Origins
The first railway line in this region was open in 1857 connecting Madurai to Trichirappalli {Trichy} via Dindigul and onward. In the following year, the railway line from Madurai to the port city of Thoothukudi was completed. In the same year, another line branching off from Vanchi Maniyachchi to Tirunelveli was opened.

Only in the next century, most of the other present lines were completed. Among them were:

Madurai-Mandapam line in 1902
Tirunelveli-Kallidaikurichi line in 1902
Kallidaikurichi-Sengottai line in 1903
Kollam-Punalur line in 1904
Punalur-Sengottai line in 1904
Pamban-Rameswaram line in 1906
Pamban-Dhanushkodi line in 1908 
Mandapam-Pamban line in 1914
Virudhunagar-Tenkasi line in 1927 
Dindigul-Pollachi line in 1928
Thiruchirappalli-Pudukkottai line in 1929
Pudukkottai-Manamadurai Jn line in 1930
Virudhunagar-Aruppukkottai Line in 1963
Aruppukkottai-Manamadurai Line in 1964

Inception
The Government decided to locate the Headquarters of the Division,  which includes Tinnevely also,  at Madurai. The Madurai railway division was formed in 1956, comprising the Ernakulam-Thiruvananthapuram line, Thiruvananthapuram-Nagercoil-Tirunelveli-Madurai line, Kollam-Sengottai-Tirunelveli line, Rameswaram-Manamaadurai-Madurai line, Manamadurai-Karaikudi-Tiruchirappalli line, Madurai-Dindigul-Pollachi line Karaikudi-Thiruduraipoondi-Thiruvarur line and the other branches of these lines. All lines currently in use have been converted to Broad Gauge while remaining sections namely Madurai-Bodinayakkanur section are in the process of gauge conversion.

In 1979, certain sections of the railway division were carved out to form the Thiruvananthapuram railway division. The Metre Gauge sections of Madurai division were retained, while all the newly laid Broad Gauge Sections of Madurai Division were transferred to Trivandrum Division. Thus, the Thiruvananthapuram-Nagercoil-Kanyakumari BG line, and the under-construction Tirunelveli-Nagercoil BG line were transferred to Trivandrum Division thus bringing down the jurisdiction of the division to 1356 km.  It was then mentioned that when the Tirunelveli-Madurai line is converted into BG line the sections falling under Kanyakumari district and Tirunelveli District would be transferred back to Madurai Division. The Tirunelveli-Madurai line was converted into BG line on 8-4-1981 but the railway lines in the southern district haven't been restored till date. Kanyakumari terminal station lacks the required Railway infrastructures and therefore request for more train services were always turned down by them citing the same handicap as the reason.

Administration and jurisdiction 
Th division spans across two states namely Tamil Nadu and Kerala. In Tamil Nadu it serves a total number of 12 districts, those being: Coimbatore, Dindigul, Madurai, Pudukottai, Ramanathapuram, Sivagangai, Theni, Tiruppur, Thoothukudi, Tiruchirappalli, Tirunelveli and Virudhunagar districts. In Kerala, the division covers the district of Kollam till Kilikollur railway station.

Categorisation of stations 
The list includes the stations under the Madurai railway division and their station category.

Stations closed for passengers - Nataransankottai, Nedugulam, Manamadurai East, Kulathur, Thondaimanallur and some stations.

Performance and earnings
The division won the inter-divisional overall efficiency - Best Division - award for its performance and earnings in the financial year of 2013. The total originating earnings for the year 2013-14 is Rs 576.29 crore as against the 2012-13 actual of Rs 523.68 crore leading to a 10% growth in overall earnings. On the punctuality front, the division achieved 96.2% for express and mail trains and 96.8% for passenger trains against the target of 96 per cent. Cash awards and merit certificates were distributed to officers and stations for their performance and maintenance. Railway school students performed cultural events during the celebrations.

Operations and services

Regular trains

Special trains

Stations

See also
 Tiruchirappalli railway division
 Thiruvananthapuram railway division
 Southern Railways

References

External links
Madurai railway division

 
Transport in Madurai
Southern Railway zone
1956 establishments in Madras State
Rail transport in Tamil Nadu
Divisions of Indian Railways